Shaun de Jager (born 28 June 1991 in Pretoria) is a South African sprinter. He competed in the 4 × 400 m relay event at the 2012 Summer Olympics.

At the 2012 Summer Olympics, de Jager was part of the South African team in the 4x400 metres relay race. In the first semifinal, Ofentse Mogawane fell and dislocated his shoulder when he collided with Kenya's Vincent Kiilu, resulting in South Africa's withdrawal from the race. South Africa was passed into the final on appeal to the IAAF, due to interference from the Kenyan athlete who downed Mogawane. They were assigned the 9th lane and finished in 8th place with their season's best time of 3:03.46.

References

External links
 

Sportspeople from Pretoria
South African male sprinters
1991 births
Living people
Olympic athletes of South Africa
Athletes (track and field) at the 2012 Summer Olympics